"Glow" is a song by British singer and songwriter Ella Henderson. It was released on 5 October 2014 as the second single from her debut studio album, Chapter One. The song was written by Camille Purcell and Steve Mac.

Music video
The music video premiered on 12 August 2014. It features Ella and several other dancers performing on a dark field and then later a court yard.

Track listing

Charts

Certifications

Release history

References

2013 songs
2014 singles
Song recordings produced by Steve Mac
Songs written by Kamille (musician)
Songs written by Steve Mac
Syco Music singles
Ella Henderson songs